Frank v. Gaos, 586 U.S. ___ (2019), was a per curiam decision by the Supreme Court of the United States in a case concerning the practice of cy pres settlements in class action lawsuits. Following oral argument, the court asked the parties to submit supplemental briefs addressing whether the parties had Article III standing to pursue the case in federal courts. Supplemental briefing was completed on December 21, 2018. On March 20, 2019, the court remanded the case to the Ninth Circuit to address the plaintiffs’ standing in light of Spokeo, Inc. v. Robins.

Background and lower court decisions

In 2010, several individuals, including lead plaintiff Paloma Gaos, brought a class action against Google for allegedly leaking, in violation of privacy laws, information about their search terms to third parties by including search terms in the referrer header. After four days of negotiations, both sides agreed to a settlement, which requires approval by the presiding judge in the case to determine whether, per Rule 23(e)(2) of the Federal Rules of Civil Procedure, it is "fair, reasonable, and adequate". In exchange for settlement funds, all class members, even if they were unaware of the settlement, relinquish their claim against the defendant.

Under the proposed settlement terms, the three lawyers in the case would receive over $2 million (an hourly rate of $1000/hour) and the named plaintiffs would receive $5,000 apiece, while an additional $6 million would be given to several privacy groups under the cy-près doctrine in lieu of compensation to then remaining unnamed class action members, due to the cost of administering the payout to those estimated 129 million individuals and the low amount of compensation (an estimated four cents). The privacy groups that would receive some of the money included each of the three lawyers' alma maters and several groups that Google has supported. The district court judge in the case, Judge Edward Davlia, noted "the elephant in the room is that many of them are law schools that you attended. ... I’m disappointed that the usual suspects are still usual." Bloomberg News stated that Judge Davlia remarked that the lack of transparency in selecting the recipients of the money "raises a red flag" and "doesn’t pass the smell test", although it was nonetheless approved.

In response to the settlement, Ted Frank and Melissa Holyoak of the Competitive Enterprise Institute, two of the 129 million unnamed members of the class being represented in the case, intervened to challenge the settlement on the grounds that it violated a procedural rule that such cy-pres settlements be "fair, reasonable and adequate." Google labeled Frank as a "professional objector". The Ninth Circuit Court of Appeals upheld the use of cy-pres in this case, noting that otherwise the estimated 129 million web users that could theoretically receive damages from the suit would receive "a paltry 4 cents in recovery."

As Brian Miller of the Center for Individual Rights, in an opinion piece for Forbes, summarized the problem:

Supreme Court appeal
Frank filed a petition of certiorari in the U.S. Supreme Court. The Center for Constitutional Jurisprudence, Cato Institute, Center for Individual Rights, and Attorney General of Arizona, in a brief joined by 15 other states, filed amicus curiae briefs urging the court to grant certiorari.
The court granted certiorari on April 30, 2018. The Court gives the following as the question presented in this case:

The Solicitor General filed an amicus brief in support of neither party arguing that, before reaching the merits on the question presented, there is "considerable doubt whether the Court has Article III jurisdiction to address that question, because plaintiffs’ standing in the district court depended on a theory of injury that this Court subsequently rejected in Spokeo, Inc. v. Robins, 136 S. Ct. 1540 (2016)" and that the court may wish to vacate and remand the case to address the issue of standing.

Oral arguments were heard on October 31, 2018, with Frank having been one of the few Supreme Court attorneys ever to argue his own case. The justices were divided along partisan lines based on observers' opinions, with the liberal justices supporting the cy pres approach used, while the conservative members felt the cy pres decision denied the class members their restitution and were critical of how much of the settlement went to legal fees. Writing for SCOTUSblog, Ronald Mann noted that at oral argument "all seemed to agree that the district court’s reasoning could not withstand scrutiny under Spokeo. The point of disagreement seemed to be whether there was any prospect that the plaintiffs could identify some new argument that would satisfy Spokeo at this late date."

The following week, the court ordered the parties and the Solicitor General "to file supplemental briefs addressing whether any named plaintiff has standing such that the federal courts have Article III jurisdiction over this dispute." Briefing will be completed by December 21.

The Court issued a per curiam decision on March 20, 2019, vacating the Ninth Circuit's decision and requesting continued review based on the Spokeo decision which had been brought up in the briefing stage of the case, in which questioned whether there was proper standing in this case. As the Spokeo question was not considered at the Ninth Circuit, the Supreme Court could not be the first court to consider that matter, and thus returned the case to the Ninth Circuit, expressing no view on the matter otherwise.

Notes

References

External links
 
Case page at SCOTUSblog
Motion of plaintiffs in the district court to settle the case

2019 in United States case law
United States class action case law
United States civil due process case law
United States Supreme Court cases
United States Supreme Court cases of the Roberts Court
Google litigation
Competitive Enterprise Institute
United States privacy case law